The Football Association of Malawi (FAM) is the governing body controlling the sport of football in the central African country of Malawi.  The Association is affiliated to the Confederation of African Football, FIFA and COSAFA.

History

The Football Association of Malawi has been mostly associated with the senior national team called the Flames. This team has been participating in international competitions since the 60s but has not had any honours as yet. It has qualified for the African cup of nations only one in the late 70s and the All Africa Cup in the 80s. The Flames were champions of CECAFA in 1978,1979 and 1988

Of late the Flames changed their coach, a local legend Kinnah Phiri who inspired them to qualify for the Africa Cup of Nations finals in Angola in 2010. Their only win at the AFCON Finals was a 3 - Zero beating of Algeria in their first game of the tournament. As of January 2010 they were ranked 82nd in the world and 27th in Africa. In late January 2010 the President Walter Nyamirandu told to BBC that the Organization will play at the 2022 FIFA World Cup.

Famous players
Enerst Mtawali remains the player who has achieved a lot in his playing career. He played in South Africa, France, Mexico, Argentina (Newell's Old Boys in 1995), etc. Of late there is Esau Kanyenda, the only Malawian to play European champion league with Locomotiv Moscow played in Russia, Dan Chitsulo in Germany and Clement Kafwafwa in Denmark. There were also a number of good players in South Africa like Peter Mponda, John Maduka and Patrick Mabedi.

Currently Joseph Kamwendo who plays in Mozambique, Robert Ng'ambi and Limbikani Mzava in South Africa, Tawonga Chimodzi in Greece, Robin Ngalande who played in Spain and Frank Gabadinho Mhango who plays for Orlando Pirates are few of the Flames players that have been outstanding.

The current staff of the Association

 President: Walter Nyamilandu
 Secretary General: Alfred Gunda
 Commercial and Marketing Director: Limbani Matola
 Facility and TMS Manager : Casper Jangale
 Finance & Administration Director: Christopher Mdolo
 Competitions Manager Gomezgani Zakazaka
 Administrative Assistant & Women's Desk Officer Charity Mabvumbe

References

External links
 Official website
 Malawi at the FIFA website.
  Malawi at CAF Online

Malawi
Football in Malawi
Sports organizations established in 1966
Football